The Kashmir flying squirrel (Eoglaucomys fimbriatus) is a species of rodent in the family Sciuridae. It is monotypic within the genus Eoglaucomys. It is found in Afghanistan, India and Pakistan. Its natural habitat is subtropical or tropical dry forests. It is threatened by habitat loss. The Afghan flying squirrel is usually considered a subspecies.

References

 Thorington, R. W. Jr. and R. S. Hoffman. 2005. Family Sciuridae. pp. 754–818 in Mammal Species of the World a Taxonomic and Geographic Reference. D. E. Wilson and D. M. Reeder eds. Johns Hopkins University Press, Baltimore.

Flying squirrels
Mammals of India
Mammals of Pakistan
Mammals described in 1837
Taxonomy articles created by Polbot